Omurca is a small belde (town) in Ulubey district of Uşak Province, Turkey. At  it is situated to the south of Uşak and to the north of Ulubey. The population of Omurca is 644  as of 2011. The settlement was founded  by nomadik Turkmens . The name of the town probably refers to Umur Bey of the Aydın Beylik  who lived in the early 14th century. In 1999 it was declared a seat of township. But the population has since been decreased. Main agricultural crops of the town are barley, wheat and hashish (under government supervision). Animal breeding is another economic activity.

References

Populated places in Uşak Province
Towns in Turkey
Ulubey District